Cato was a merchant vessel launched at Kingston upon Hull in 1807. She was a West Indiaman, a transport ship, and traded across the Atlantic between England and North America. She foundered in November 1841.

Career
Cato first appeared in Lloyd's Register (LR) in 1808.

Captain John Hossack acquired a letter of marque on 6 December 1808.

A gale on 13 January 1828 drove the transport ship Cato, and several other vessels, ashore in Mountbatten Bay. The initial report was that her rudder had been unshipped and that her keel was much damaged, but that it was expected that she would be refloated.  

Lloyd's List reported on 22 December 1835 that Cato had arrived at Liverpool from Quebec in a much damaged state.

Fate
She had become waterlogged as she sailed from Quebec City, to Plymouth. Her entry in LR bears the annotation "Abandoned".

Citations and references
Citations

References
 

1807 ships
Ships built in Kingston upon Hull
Age of Sail merchant ships of England
Maritime incidents in January 1828
Maritime incidents in November 1844
Shipwrecks in the Atlantic Ocean